Cova da Piedade is a former civil parish in the municipality of Almada, Lisbon metropolitan area, Portugal. In 2013, the parish merged into the new parish Almada, Cova da Piedade, Pragal e Cacilhas. The population in 2011 was 19,904, in an area of 1.42 km2. The parish was founded on February 7, 1928.

Sites of interest
Fábrica de Moagem do Caramujo
Palacete António José Gomes

Famous people from Cova da Piedade
 Luís Figo

Historic events
 Battle of Cova da Piedade (1833)

References

External links
Official website 

Former parishes of Almada